Parrano is a comune (municipality) in the Province of Terni in the Italian region Umbria, located about 35 km southwest of Perugia and about 50 km northwest of Terni.

Parrano borders the following municipalities: Ficulle, Montegabbione, San Venanzo.

References

External links
 Official website

Cities and towns in Umbria